The following highways are numbered 90:

Brazil
 BR-090

Canada
 Newfoundland and Labrador Route 90
 Winnipeg Route 90

Israel/Palestine
 Highway 90 (Israel–Palestine)

Italy
 Autostrada A90

Korea, South
Gukjido 90

New Zealand
  New Zealand State Highway 90

United Kingdom
 A90 road
 M90 motorway

United States
 Interstate 90
 U.S. Route 90
 Arizona State Route 90
 Arkansas Highway 90
 California State Route 90
 Colorado State Highway 90
 Florida State Road 90
 Georgia State Route 90
 Illinois Route 90
 Iowa Highway 90 (1926–1932) (former)
 K-90 (Kansas highway)
 Kentucky Route 90
 Maine State Route 90
 Maryland Route 90
 M-90 (Michigan highway)
 Minnesota State Highway 90 (former)
 County Road 90 (St. Louis County, Minnesota)
 Missouri Route 90
 Nebraska Highway 90 (former)
 Nebraska Spur 90A
 Nebraska Spur 90B
 Nevada State Route 90 (former)
 New Jersey Route 90
 County Route 90 (Bergen County, New Jersey)
 New Mexico State Road 90
 New York State Route 90
 County Route 90 (Cattaraugus County, New York)
 County Route 90 (Dutchess County, New York)
 County Route 90 (Jefferson County, New York)
 County Route 90 (Oneida County, New York)
 County Route 90 (Orange County, New York)
 County Route 90 (Rensselaer County, New York)
 County Route 90 (Rockland County, New York)
 County Route 90 (Saratoga County, New York)
 County Route 90 (Steuben County, New York)
 County Route 90 (Suffolk County, New York)
 County Route 90 (Westchester County, New York)
 North Carolina Highway 90
 Ohio State Route 90 (1923) (former)
 Oregon Route 90 (former)
 Pennsylvania Route 90 (1920s-1960s) (former)
 South Carolina Highway 90
 Tennessee State Route 90
 Texas State Highway 90
 Texas State Highway Loop 90
 Farm to Market Road 90
 Utah State Route 90
 Virginia State Route 90
 West Virginia Route 90
 Wisconsin Highway 90 (former)
 Wyoming Highway 90

See also
A90